, colloquially known as , is a serialized, 15 minutes per episode, Japanese television drama program series broadcast in the mornings by Japanese public broadcaster NHK. The first such series aired in 1961 with the black-and-white , starring Takeshi Kitazawa which aired in Japan Monday through Friday mornings—it was also the only of such series to be aired for 20 minutes per episode.

Due to the practice of wiping commonly in practice around the world in the 1960s and 1970s, not all episodes of all pre-1980 asadora series survive, as the 2-inch Quad videotapes were often wiped and reused; 16 of the produced asadora series in total are incomplete in the NHK archives, with several series having no surviving episodes at all.

Asadora currently airs in Japan Monday through Saturday mornings on NHK General TV from 8:00 to 8:15, with a rebroadcast the same day from 12:45 to 13:00. The asadora have become some of the most popular shows on Japanese television, with series such as Oshin, earning an overall 52.6-percent ratings for the series. 

Virtually all of the storylines center on the life of a female heroine who faces challenges while working to achieve her dreams. The heroine is chosen by NHK through an audition that involves interviews with several thousand applicants. The winning actress not only stars in an asadora, but also becomes a spokeswoman for NHK, and is usually involved in NHK-sponsored events—including the annual Kōhaku Uta Gassen New Year's Eve event. Often, the asadora serves as a springboard for the actress to other opportunities within the Japanese entertainment industry.

The current series is Maiagare! (2022).

List of series

See also 
Television in Japan
Japanese television drama
Taiga drama
KBS TV Novel, drama series of similar format produced by KBS in South Korea

References

External links 
 Official webpage  

 
1961 Japanese television series debuts
Japanese entertainment terms
NHK original programming